The Peerage of Ireland consists of those titles of nobility created by the English monarchs in their capacity as Lord or King of Ireland, or later by monarchs of the United Kingdom of Great Britain and Ireland. It is one of the five divisions of Peerages in the United Kingdom. The creation of such titles came to an end in the 19th century. The ranks of the Irish peerage are duke, marquess, earl, viscount and baron. As of 2016, there were 135 titles in the Peerage of Ireland extant: two dukedoms, ten marquessates, 43 earldoms, 28 viscountcies, and 52 baronies. The Crown of the United Kingdom of Great Britain and Northern Ireland continues to exercise jurisdiction over the Peerage of Ireland, including those peers whose titles derive from places located in what is now the Republic of Ireland. Article 40.2 of the Constitution of Ireland forbids the state conferring titles of nobility and an Irish citizen may not accept titles of nobility or honour except with the prior approval of the Irish government. This issue has not arisen in respect of the Peerage of Ireland because no creation of titles in it has been made since the constitution came into force.

In the following table, each peer is listed only by his highest Irish title, showing higher or equal titles in the other peerages. Those peers who are known by a higher title in one of the other peerages are listed in italics.

History

A modest number of titles in the peerage of Ireland date from the Middle Ages. Before 1801, Irish peers had the right to sit in the Irish House of Lords, on the abolition of which by the Union effective in 1801 by an Act of 1800 they elected a small proportion – twenty-eight representative peers – of their number (and elected replacements as they died) to the House of Lords at Westminster.

Both before and after the Union, Irish peerages were often used as a way of creating peerages which did not grant a seat in the House of Lords of England (before 1707) or Great Britain (after 1707) and so allowed the grantee (such as Clive of India) to sit in the House of Commons in London. As a consequence, many late-made Irish peers had little or no connection to Ireland, and indeed the names of some Irish peerages refer to places in Great Britain (for example, the Earldom of Mexborough refers to a place in England and the Earldom of Ranfurly refers to a village in Scotland).

Irish peerages continued to be created for almost a century after the union, although the treaty of union placed restrictions on their numbers: three needed to become extinct before a new peerage could be granted, until there were only one hundred Irish peers (exclusive of those who held any peerage of Great Britain subsisting at the time of the union, or of the United Kingdom created since the union). There was a spate of creations of Irish peerages from 1797 onward, mostly peerages of higher ranks for existing Irish peers, as part of the negotiation of the Act of Union; this ended in the first week of January 1801, but the restrictions of the Act were not applied to the last few peers. In the following decades, Irish peerages were created at least as often as the Act permitted until at least 1856. But the pace then slowed, with only four more being created in the rest of the 19th century, and none in the 20th and 21st centuries.

The last two grants of Irish peerages were the promotion of the Marquess of Abercorn (a peerage of Great Britain) to be Duke of Abercorn in the Irish Peerage when he became Lord-Lieutenant of Ireland in 1868 and the granting of the Curzon of Kedleston barony to George Curzon when he became Viceroy of India in 1898. Peers of Ireland have precedence below peers of England, Scotland, and Great Britain of the same rank, and above peers of the United Kingdom of the same rank; but Irish peers created after 1801 yield to United Kingdom peers of earlier creation. Accordingly, the Duke of Abercorn (the junior duke in the Peerage of Ireland) ranks between the Duke of Sutherland and the Duke of Westminster (both dukes in the Peerage of the United Kingdom).

When one of the Irish representative peers died, the Irish Peerage met to elect his replacement; but the office required to arrange this were abolished as part of the creation of the Irish Free State. The existing representative peers kept their seats in the House of Lords, but they have not been replaced. Since the death of Francis Needham, 4th Earl of Kilmorey in 1961, none remains. The right of the Irish Peerage to elect representatives was abolished by the Statute Law (Repeals) Act 1971.

Titles in the Peerage of the United Kingdom have also referred to places in Ireland, for example Baron Arklow (created 1801 and 1881) or Baron Killarney (created 1892 and 1920). Since partition, only places in Northern Ireland have been used, although the 1880 title "Baron Mount Temple, of Mount Temple in the County of Sligo", was recreated in 1932 as "Baron Mount Temple, of Lee in the County of Southampton".

Ranks

In the following table of the Peerage of Ireland as it currently stands, each peer's highest titles in each of the other peerages (if any) are also listed.

Irish peers possessed of titles in any of the other peerages (except Scotland, which only got the right to an automatic seat in 1963, with the Peerage Act 1963) had automatic seats in the House of Lords until 1999.

The Earl of Darnley inherited the Baron Clifton in the Peerage of England in 1722–1900 and 1937–1999 as the barony is in writ.

Dukes in the Peerage of Ireland

Marquesses in the Peerage of Ireland

Earls in the Peerage of Ireland

Viscounts in the Peerage of Ireland

Barons in the Peerage of Ireland

In Ireland, barony may also refer to a semi-obsolete political subdivision of a county. There is no connection between such a barony and the noble title of baron.

Extinct peerages

Two peerages have become extinct since the passage of the House of Lords Act 1999:
Earl of Egmont, Viscount Perceval (sep)
Earl of Dunraven and Mount-Earl, Viscount Mount-Earl (sep)

See also 

 List of Irish representative peers
 Irish nobility, which distinguishes three groups of Irish nobility, the other two being:
 Gaelic nobility of Ireland
 Hiberno-Normans

Notes

References

External links

Ireland and the Commonwealth of Nations
 
Ireland
Parliament of Ireland
Peerages